The Chapadmalalan age is a period of geologic time (4.0–3.0 Ma) within the Pliocene epoch of the Neogene used more specifically with South American Land Mammal Ages. It follows the Montehermosan and precedes the Uquian age.

Fossil content 
Fossils of Josephoartigasia magna, a rodent in the family Dinomyidae from this age have been found in southern Uruguay.

References 

 
Neogene South America
Pliocene life
Piacenzian
Zanclean